2000 A.D. is a chess variant created by V. R. Parton which employs fairy chess pieces on a 10×10 board. Parton published the variant in his 1972 monograph My Game for 2000 A.D. and After.

Description
Parton describes his invention as "the game for Future Players in the Next Millennium", feeling that to be sufficiently challenging for later generations a variant should possess a larger board and increased possibilities. The distinction between moving and capturing methods of most of the pieces is a feature characteristic of the game.

The Gorgon, Ximaera (Chimaera), and Fury are all terrifying female monsters from Greek mythology. The Dragon is also referred to by Parton as female . The Attendant stands next to the Empress at the beginning of the game and moves as a chess king, but is stripped of all normal .

Game rules

White moves first. Capturing the enemy Empress wins the game. There is no castling or checking in 2000 A.D.

Pieces that move and capture the same way
The following pieces capture the same as they move :

Empress (E)
 Moves as a chess queen;
 If captured the game is over.

Attendant (A)
 Moves as a chess king without royal powers.

Unicorn (U)
 Moves as a chess knight.
 A Unicorn has the ability to capture Gorgons.

Pawn (P)
 Moves one step straight or diagonally forward;
 A Pawn can promote on entering opponent's half of the board to any piece previously lost.

Pieces that move as a queen but have other power
The following pieces move as a chess queen, but capture (or exercise other power) in their own special ways:

Capricorn (C)
 Captures by charging (moving to a vacant square orthogonally or diagonally adjacent to) an enemy piece;
 Can capture up to seven pieces in one turn, if they are all adjacent to the square the Capricorn charges to.
 A Capricorn has the ability to capture Gorgons.

Gorgon (G)
 Captures as a chess queen;
 Petrifies (immobilizes) any enemy piece it attacks;
 If petrified by an enemy Gorgon, does not lose its power to petrify other pieces;
 A Gorgon can be captured only by a Unicorn or a Capricorn.

Ximaera (X)
 Cannot capture but is subject to capture;
 Swaps places with any enemy piece it attacks;
 If swapped with an enemy Ximaera, the player may reverse-swap them, but not on his next turn.

Dragon (D)
 Captures by leaping an enemy piece to any vacant square immediately beyond it;
 Can make multiple captures in a single turn in the same direction;
 In a multiple capture, a Dragon is immobilized after one of the captures, if a Gorgon attacks it.

Mimotaur (M)
 The Mimotaur (presumably a Minotaur that mimics) captures in the same manner as the piece being captured;
 Counter-petrifies an enemy Gorgon;
 Can swap places with an enemy Ximaera;
 A Mimotaur is incapable of attacking another Mimotaur;
 Must be adjacent to the Attendant to capture it;
 Must be in front of and adjacent to a pawn to capture it.

Alternate piece
The following is an alternate piece; if used, Furies replace Gorgons in the starting position:

Fury (F)
 Combines the powers of all the other pieces "[...] into one Supreme Terror" .

See also
 Ultima

Notes

References

Bibliography

Chess variants
Fairy chess
1972 in chess
Board games introduced in 1972